Clive Malcolm Tennant (birth registered second ¼ 1956) is an English former professional rugby league footballer who played in the 1970s and Labour Party politician who is currently serving as Mayor of Featherstone.

Playing career

Tennant made his début for Featherstone Rovers on Thursday 29 December 1977.

Political career 
Tennant is the incumbent Mayor of Featherstone for the term 2020-21, having served as Deputy Mayor for the term 2019-20.

Tennant is also a district councillor on Wakefield Council representing Pontefract North since 2003.

Personal life
Clive Tennant is son of the rugby league footballer Walter Tennant, the grandson of the rugby league footballer Buff Lord (Harold Tennant), and the nephew of the rugby league footballer Alan Tennant.

References

External links

Search for "Tennant" at  rugbyleagueproject.org
Walter Tennant, Alan Tennant, Nelson Tennant and Clive Tennant
Contact → Clive Tennant
Photograph of Clive Tennant

1956 births
Living people
English rugby league players
Featherstone Rovers players
Rugby league players from Pontefract
Rugby league wingers
Labour Party (UK) councillors
People from Featherstone
Politicians from Pontefract